PAS or Pas may refer to:

Companies and organizations
 Pakistan Academy of Sciences
 Pakistan Administrative Service
 Pan Am Southern, a freight railroad owned by Norfolk Southern and Pan Am Railways
 Pan American Silver, a mining company in Canada
 Paradox Access Solutions, a construction company
 Percussive Arts Society, percussion organization
 Petroleum Air Services, an Egyptian airline operating helicopter services to support the oil industry
 Poetry Association of Scotland
 Polish Academy of Sciences
 Port Auxiliary Service, formerly the British Admiralty Yard Craft Service
 Production Automotive Services, an American specialty vehicle manufacturer

Political parties
 Malaysian Islamic Party, Malaysia
 Partido Alianza Social, Mexico
 Party of Action and Solidarity, Moldova

Places
 The Pas (electoral district), in Manitoba, Canada
 The Pas, town in Canada
 Le Pas, commune in France
 Sihanoukville Autonomous Port (Port Autonome de Sihanoukville), Cambodia

Science
 PAS diastase stain
 PAS domain, a protein domain
 Panic and Agoraphobia Scale, a psychological rating scale
 Para-aminosalicylic acid, a treatment for tuberculosis
 Parental alienation syndrome
 Periodic acid-Schiff stain for biological tissues
 Post-abortion syndrome
 Pascal second (Pa⋅s), SI unit of viscosity
 PolyAcenic Semiconductor

Sports
 PAS Giannina, a Greek football club from Ioannina
 PAS Hamedan F.C., an Iranian football club from Hamedan
 PAS Tehran F.C., a defunct Iranian football club from Tehran
 Pan American Stadium (New Orleans)
 Pan American Stadium (Winnipeg)
 Pan American Stakes, an American Thoroughbred horse race

Technology
 Personal Access System, a wireless telephone standard
 Pedal assist system, on an electric bicycle
 Positron annihilation spectroscopy
 Patient administration system, developed out of the automation of administrative paperwork
 Process automation system, for industrial plants
 Media Vision Pro AudioSpectrum, computer sound cards
 .pas, Pascal programming language file extension
 PAS 1, etc. satellites by PanAmSat
 Power-assisted steering, or power steering, in automobiles

Other uses
 Pacific American School, an international school in Hsinchu City, Taiwan
 Pas (river), in Spain
 List of positions filled by presidential appointment with Senate confirmation, "Presidential Appointment needing Senate confirmation"
 Ion Pas (1895-1974), Romanian writer and politician
 Physician-assisted suicide
 Portable Antiquities Scheme, UK record of small archaeological finds
 Publicly Available Specification, UK consultative standards documents

See also
 Pan American School (disambiguation)
 Pan American Stadium (disambiguation)